Thomas Duff (born 1956) is an American billionaire businessman.

Duff earned a bachelor's degree from the University of Southern Mississippi.

Together with his brother James Duff, he is the founder and co-owner of Duff Capital Investors, a holding company with annual turnover in excess of $2.6 billion. The brothers inherited Southern Tire Mart from their father, Ernest Duff.

He is divorced, with two children, and lives in Hattiesburg, Mississippi.

References

Living people
1950s births
People from Hattiesburg, Mississippi
University of Southern Mississippi alumni
Businesspeople from Mississippi
American company founders
American billionaires